Charles Vincent Moran (March 26, 1879 – April 11, 1934) was a professional baseball infielder who played in Major League Baseball for the Washington Senators (1903–1904) and the St. Louis Browns (1904–1905). He attended Georgetown University.

References

External links
 Baseball-Reference.com

1879 births
1934 deaths
Major League Baseball infielders
St. Louis Browns players
Washington Senators (1901–1960) players
Indianapolis Indians players
Rochester Bronchos players
Scranton Miners players
Georgetown Hoyas baseball coaches
Plattsburgh (baseball) players